The Dęby Szlacheckie coal mine is a large mine in the north of Poland in Dęby Szlacheckie, Greater Poland Voivodeship, 130 km north-west of the capital, Warsaw. Dęby Szlacheckie represents one of the largest coal reserves in Poland having estimated reserves of 92 million tonnes of coal. Annual coal production is around 3.3 million tonnes.

The Association of Brown Coal Producers in Poland has identified the mine as a possible source of fuel for power plants.

References 

Coal mines in Poland
Coal mines in Greater Poland Voivodeship